The 1994 California Golden Bears football team was an American football team that represented the University of California, Berkeley in the Pacific-10 Conference (Pac-10) during the 1994 NCAA Division I-A football season. In their third year under head coach Keith Gilbertson, the Golden Bears compiled a 4–7 record (3–5 against Pac-10 opponents), finished in a tie for sixth place in the Pac-10, and were outscored by their opponents by a combined score of 248 to 212.

The team's statistical leaders included Dave Barr with 1,077 passing yards, Reynard Rutherford with 713 rushing yards, and Iheanyi Uwaezuoke with 716 receiving yards.

Schedule

References

California
California Golden Bears football seasons
California Golden Bears football